Arthur Lewis Callow (May 1869 – November 8, 1955) was an American politician in the state of Washington. He served in the Washington House of Representatives from 1941 to 1951.

References

1955 deaths
1869 births
Democratic Party members of the Washington House of Representatives
Politicians from Milwaukee
People from Elma, Washington